Postcards from No Man's Land is a young-adult novel by Aidan Chambers, published by Bodley Head in 1999. Two stories are set in Amsterdam during 1994 and 1944. One features 17-year-old visitor Jacob Todd during the 50-year commemoration of the Battle of Arnhem, in which his grandfather fought; the other features 19-year-old Geertrui late in the German occupation of the Netherlands. It was the fifth of six novels in the series Chambers calls "The Dance Sequence", which he inaugurated in 1978 with Breaktime.

Chambers won the annual Carnegie Medal, from the Library Association, recognising the year's best children's book by a British subject. In 2001 The Guardian named it one of ten books recommended for teenage boys, and called it a "seriously good and compulsively readable novel that spans 50 years and two interwoven stories of love, betrayal and self-discovery".
 
Postcards from No Man's Land was first published in the U.S. by Dutton in 2002. There it won the Michael L. Printz Award from the American Library Association recognising the year's best book for young adults.

WorldCat reports that Postcards is the work by Chambers most widely held in participating libraries, by a wide margin.

One library catalogue record recommends Postcards for American "senior high school" students and the British librarians call it a "sophisticated book for older teenagers. Issues of euthanasia and sexual identity are raised. This is an emotionally and intellectually challenging book and one that lingers in the mind."

Notes

References

External links
  —immediately, first US edition 
 Reviews of Postcards from No Man's Land reprinted by the author

1999 British novels
1999 children's books
British young adult novels
Children's historical novels
Novels set during World War II
Carnegie Medal in Literature winning works
Michael L. Printz Award-winning works
Novels set in Amsterdam
Fiction set in 1944
The Bodley Head books